Andrzej Sapkowski (born 21 June 1948) is a Polish fantasy writer, essayist, translator and a trained economist. He is best known for his six-volume series of books The Witcher, which revolves around the eponymous "witcher," a monster-hunter, Geralt of Rivia. It began with the publication of Blood of Elves (1994) and was completed with the publication of standalone prequel novel Season of Storms (2013). The saga has been popularised through television, cinema, stage, comic books, video games and translated into 37 languages making him the second most-translated Polish science fiction and fantasy writer after Stanisław Lem. 

He was born in Łódź and initially pursued a career as an economist after graduating from the University of Łódź. He turned to writing, first as a translator and later as an author of fantasy books, following the success of his first short story The Witcher published in 1986 in the Fantastyka magazine.

Described as the "Polish Tolkien", he wrote 10 novels and 8 short story collections, which sold over 30 million copies worldwide. The influence of Slavic mythology is seen as a characteristic feature of many of his works. He is a five-time recipient of the Zajdel Award, Poland's most popular science fiction and fantasy prize, as well as many other awards and honours including David Gemmell Award, World Fantasy Life Achievement Award and the Medal for Merit to Culture – Gloria Artis.

Early life
He was born on 21 June 1948 in Łódź. His father served in the Polish People's Army and participated in the Battle of Berlin. After the end of World War II, his parents lived near Nowa Sól before settling in Łódź in Central Poland. He attended the Bolesław Prus High School No. 21. He also  studied economics at the University of Łódź, and before turning to writing, he had worked as a senior sales representative for a foreign trade company. He started his literary career as a translator, in particular, of science fiction. Among the first works translated by him was The Words of Guru by Cyril M. Kornbluth.

Career

Major works
He says he wrote his first short story, The Witcher ("Wiedźmin", also translated "The Hexer" or "Spellmaker"), on a whim, in order to enter a contest by Polish science fiction and fantasy magazine Fantastyka. In an interview, he said that being a businessman at the time and thus familiar with marketing, he knew how to sell, and indeed, he won third prize. The story was published in Fantastyka in 1986 and was enormously successful both with readers and critics. Sapkowski has created a cycle of tales based on the world of "The Witcher", comprising three collections of short stories and six novels. This cycle and his other works have made him one of the best-known fantasy authors in Poland in the 1990s.

The main character of "The Witcher" is Geralt of Rivia, a monster hunter trained for this since childhood. Geralt exists in a morally ambiguous universe, yet manages to maintain his own coherent code of ethics. At the same time cynical and noble, Geralt has been compared to Raymond Chandler's signature character Philip Marlowe. The world in which these adventures take place is heavily influenced by Slavic mythology.

In her review of Blood of Elves, Alice Wybrew of Total Sci-Fi writes that "Moving effortlessly between moments of wrought emotion and staggeringly effective action, to lengthy periods of political discussion and war stratagems, Sapkowski addresses every aspect of a good fantasy novel eloquently and with ease. His style reads as easily as David Gemmel, but hits harder and deeper than his late fantasy comrade. Creating a world that is both familiar and comfortable, it is through his inventive use of character manipulation that he generates a new and realistic experience". 

In 2001, he published the Manuscript Discovered in a Dragon's Cave, an original and personal guide to fantasy literature. It was written in the form of an encyclopaedia and the author discusses in it the history of the literary genre, well-known fantasy heroes, descriptions of magic terminology as well as major works of notable writers including J.R.R. Tolkien's The Hobbit and The Lord of the Rings, Robert E. Howard's Conan, C.S. Lewis's The Chronicles of Narnia, Ursula K. Le Guin's Earthsea, Roger Zelazny's The Chronicles of Amber, J.K. Rowling's Harry Potter or George R.R. Martin's A Song of Ice and Fire.  

Sapkowski's next book series was The Hussite Trilogy set in the 15th century at the time of the Hussite Wars with Reinmar of Bielawa as the main protagonist. Mariusz Czubaj writes:

Although The Hussite Trilogy proved less popular compared to The Witcher, it has been described as the author's "magnum opus". Published between 2002 and 2006, the series was released as an audiobook in 2019.

Legal dispute with CD Projekt
In October 2018, he filed a lawsuit against CD Projekt demanding 60 million zloty ($16.1 million) in royalty payments from the company for using the Witcher universe in their computer games. The lawsuit was launched despite the fact that Sapkowski had sold the video game rights to the Witcher for a single sum, rather than through a royalties contract. Sapkowski and his lawyers based their lawsuit on Article 44 of the Copyright and Related Rights Act.

CD Projekt released a statement claiming that the author's demands are groundless and that the company had legitimately and legally acquired copyright to Sapkowski's works. His decision was criticized by many commentators and gaming journalists including Dmitry Glukhovsky, the author of Metro 2033, who described him as "an old fool" and noted that without the gaming franchise, the Witcher series "would never get this crazy international readership" and would have remained popular only in Central and Eastern Europe. 

On 20 December 2019, the writer and the company resolved the lawsuit with an amicable settlement. The company stated this deal was made in an effort "to maintain good relations with authors of works which have inspired CD Projekt Red’s own creations." The details of this arrangement weren't made public.

Personal life

Sapkowski resides in his hometown of Łódź in central Poland. He is an atheist. He had a son named Krzysztof (1972–2019), who was an avid reader of the Polish Fantastyka magazine, and for whom he wrote the first Witcher story, who has since  deceased.

Sapkowski is a member of the Polish Writers' Association. In an interview, he mentioned that his favorite writers included Ernest Hemingway, Mikhail Bulgakov, Raymond Chandler and Umberto Eco. 

In 2005, Stanisław Bereś conducted a lengthy interview with Sapkowski that was eventually published in a book form as Historia i fantastyka.

Translations and adaptations of Sapkowski's works
Sapkowski's books have been translated into Bulgarian, Chinese, Croatian, Czech, Dutch, English, Estonian, Finnish, French, Georgian, German, Hungarian, Italian, Korean, Lithuanian, Norwegian, Portuguese, Romanian, Russian, Serbian, Slovak, Spanish, Swedish, Turkish and Ukrainian. An English translation of The Last Wish short story collection was published by Gollancz in 2007. From 2008, the Witcher saga is published by Gollancz. The English translation of Sapkowski's novel Blood of Elves won the David Gemmell Legend Award in 2009.

In the years 1993–1995, a six-issue comic book series entitled The Witcher was released in the Komiks magazine by Prószyński i S-ka publishing house. The comic was written by Maciej Parowski and illustrated by Bogusław Polch. The comics were the first attempt to portray the Witcher universe outside the novels. Since 2014, a comic book series The Witcher has been published by the American publisher Dark Horse Comics. The stories presented in the series are mostly originals, written not by Andrzej Sapkowski but by other writers; the exception being volume 2, Fox Children, which adapted a story from the anthology Season of Storms.  

In 2001, a television series based on the Witcher cycle was released in Poland and internationally, entitled Wiedźmin (The Hexer). A film by the same title was compiled from excerpts of the television series but both have been critical and box office failures.

In 2009, Russian heavy metal band Esse staged The Road with No Return, a rock opera based on the works by Sapkowski. Yevgeny Pronin is the author of the libretto and the composer of much of the opera's music. The premiere of the opera took place the same year in Rostov-on-Don and was subsequently released as a DVD in 2012.

The Polish game developer, CD Projekt Red, created a role-playing game series based on The Witcher universe. The first game, titled simply The Witcher, was first released in October 2007. The sequel, The Witcher 2: Assassins of Kings was released in 2011. The third game in the trilogy, The Witcher 3: Wild Hunt, was released in May 2015. The game shipped over 40 million copies, making it one of the best selling video games of all time.

In May 2017, Netflix commissioned The Witcher, an English-language adaptation of the book series. The Witcher television series premiered on Netflix on 20 December 2019. Sapkowski served for a while as a creative consultant on the project. The popularity of the Netflix show led to Sapkowski topping Amazon's list of best-selling authors ahead of J.K. Rowling and Stephen King. A spin-off anime The Witcher: Nightmare of the Wolf, produced by Lauren Schmidt Hissrich, premiered in 2021. 

In September 2017, a musical Wiedźmin (The Witcher) directed by Wojciech Kościelniak was premiered at the Musical Theatre in Gdynia. 

The Witcher: Blood Origin is a fantasy miniseries created by Declan de Barra and Lauren Schmidt Hissrich adapted from The Witcher book series which serves as a prequel to the Netflix television series. It was released on Netflix in December 2022.

Awards and recognition
Sapkowski is a recipient of numerous awards and honours both Polish and foreign including: 

2016: World Fantasy Award—Life Achievement for The Witcher saga
2012: Tähtifantasia Award (Finland) for his short story Sword of Destiny translated from Polish by Tapani Kärkkäinen; Science Fiction & Fantasy Translation Award nomination for his novel Spellmaker, translated from the Polish by Michael Kandel 
2011: FantLab's Book of the Year Award (Russia) for his short story Żmija (Viper) in the Best Translated Novella or Short Story category
2010: European Science Fiction Society "European Grand Master" honorary award
2009: David Gemmell Legend Award
2008: Honorary citizenship of the city of Łódź
2003: Ignotus Award (Spain) for The Last Wish in the Best Anthology category and for Muzykanci (The Musicians) in the Best Foreign Short Story category; Nike Award nomination (Poland's top literary prize) for his novel Narrenturm 
2002: Janusz A. Zajdel for his novel Narrenturm
1997: Polityka's Passport award, which is awarded annually to artists who have strong prospects for international success
1996: European Science Fiction Society Hall of Fame: author
1995: Raczyński Library Award for lifetime achievements
1994: Janusz A. Zajdel Award for his novel Krew elfów (Blood of Elves)
1993: Ikaros Award (Czech Republic); Janusz A. Zajdel Award for his short story W leju po bombie (In a Bomb Crater)
1992: Janusz A. Zajdel Award for his short story Miecz przeznaczenia (Sword of Destiny)
1990: Janusz A. Zajdel Award for his short story Mniejsze zło (The Lesser of Two Evils)

Orders
2014: Silver Medal Gloria Artis, conferred by the Ministry of Culture and National Heritage of the Republic of Poland

Bibliography

The Witcher Saga

Short story collections 
The Witcher (pl:Wiedźmin, 1990), 5 stories. Currently out of print, although 4 of its stories were reprinted in The Last Wish along with new material, while the fifth story was reprinted in Something ends, Something begins and The Malady and Other Stories.
Sword of Destiny (Miecz przeznaczenia, 1992), 6 stories. English edition: 2015
The Last Wish (Ostatnie życzenie, 1993), 7 stories. English edition: 2007 (in US: 2008). Its stories (including both its original stories and the stories which it republishes from The Witcher) take place before Sword of Destiny even though it was published later.
The short story "The Hexer" in the English anthology Chosen by Fate: Zajdel Award Winner Anthology (by SuperNOVA in cooperation with the Silesian Club of Fantasy Literature, 2000) is an English translation by Agnieszka Fulińska of the short story "The Witcher" which had previously been published in Polish in The Witcher and The Last Wish. The Last Wish was later translated into English in full.
The short story "Spellmaker" in the English anthology A Polish Book of Monsters (edited and translated by Michael Kandel, 2010) is another translation of the short story "The Witcher" which had previously been published in The Witcher, The Last Wish, and Chosen by Fate: Zajdel Award Winner Anthology.
Something Ends, Something Begins (pl:Coś się kończy, coś się zaczyna, 2000), 8 stories. Only two of its stories are related to The Witcher saga ("The Road with No Return" and the titular "Something Ends, Something Begins").
The Malady and Other Stories (:pl:Maladie i inne opowiadania, 2012), 10 stories. It includes the 8 stories from Something ends, Something begins plus two new stories that aren't related to The Witcher saga. The only one of its stories that was translated into English is the titular "The Malady" which was published in 2014 under the title The Malady and Other Stories, although that English publication didn't include the other 9 stories from the Polish collection of the same name.

Pentalogy 
Blood of Elves (Krew elfów, 1994). English edition: 2009
Time of Contempt (Czas pogardy, 1995). English edition: 27 June 2013
Baptism of Fire (Chrzest ognia, 1996). English edition: 6 March 2014
The Tower of Swallows (Wieża Jaskółki, 1997). English edition: May 2016
Lady of the Lake (Pani Jeziora, 1999). English edition: 14 March 2017

Standalone Prequel novel 
 Season of Storms (Sezon burz, 2013). English edition: 22 May 2018 – set between the short stories in The Last Wish

Hussite Trilogy 
The Tower of Fools (Narrenturm, 2002). English edition: 2020
Warriors of God (Boży bojownicy, 2004)
Light Perpetual (Lux perpetua, 2006)

Other novels 
Viper (Żmija, 2009), a stand-alone novel set during the Soviet–Afghan War

Other works 
The Eye of Yrrhedes (Oko Yrrhedesa, 1995), roleplaying game
The World of King Arthur. Maladie (Świat króla Artura. Maladie, 1995), essay and an illustrated short story set in Arthurian mythology
Manuscript Discovered in a Dragon's Cave (Rękopis znaleziony w Smoczej Jaskini, 2001), fantasy encyclopedic compendium

See also
Polish literature
Science fiction and fantasy in Poland
List of Polish writers
Stanisław Lem
Jacek Dukaj
Janusz A. Zajdel Award
Toss a Coin to Your Witcher
Gwent: The Witcher Card Game
The Witcher: Monster Slayer

References

External links

Andrzej Sapkowski's official site

 Andrzej Sapkowski at Culture.pl
Canon of fantasy literature, by Andrzej Sapkowski

 
1948 births
Living people
People from Łódź
Polish fantasy writers
20th-century Polish novelists
21st-century Polish novelists
Polish male novelists
Polish male short story writers
Polish short story writers
20th-century Polish male writers
21st-century Polish male writers
20th-century short story writers
21st-century short story writers
Writers of historical fiction set in the Middle Ages
Polish translators
Polish economists
Constructed language creators
University of Łódź alumni
Recipients of the Silver Medal for Merit to Culture – Gloria Artis
World Fantasy Award-winning writers
Slavic mythology in popular culture
Works based on Slavic mythology
Polish atheists
Atheist writers
Former Roman Catholics
Writers from Łódź
People from Łódź Voivodeship